Summit Fever is a 2022 British thriller film directed by Julian Gilbey and starring Ryan Phillippe.

Cast
Freddie Thorp as Michael
Michel Biel as Jean-Pierre
Mathilde Warnier as Isabelle
Theo Christine as Rudi
Ryan Phillippe as Leo
Hannah New as Natascha
Jocelyn Wedow as Béa
Jacopo Carter as Angelo
Gianmarco Saurino as Tino
Thomas Ancora as Damien Roux
Jake Meniani as Claude
Régis Romele as Mr Beaudin
Nancy Tate as Mrs Beaudin
Laura Ferries as Lucy
Rupert Procter as Michael's Dad
Nick Nevern as David

Production
Production on the film began in January 2018.  The film was shot in Chamonix.  As of November 2021, the film is in post-production.

Release
The film was released in theaters and on demand and digital platforms on October 14, 2022.

Reception
The film has a 38% rating on Rotten Tomatoes based on 13 reviews.

References

External links
 

Films shot in France
Saban Films films